An office of emergency management (OEM), alternatively called an emergency management office (EMO), or an emergency management agency (EMA) in some areas, is an agency at the local, tribal, state, national or international level that holds responsibility for comprehensively planning for and responding to and recovering from all manner of disasters, whether man-made or natural. An OEM may also be requested to provide consequence management for large special events such as major gatherings, visiting dignitaries, etc.

List

U.S. local
City of Sacramento's Office of Emergency Management (SacOEM) 
Houston Office of Emergency Management  
Chicago Office of Emergency Management and Communications (OEMC) 
Los Angeles Emergency Management Department (EMD) 
New Orleans Office of Homeland Security & Emergency Preparedness 
New York City Emergency Management (NYCEM) (previously the New York City Office of Emergency Management) 
Philadelphia Office of Emergency Management 
San Diego Office of Homeland Security (OHS)

U.S. States
Alaska Division of Homeland Security & Emergency Management (Alaska DHS) 
Arizona Department of Homeland Security (AZDOHS) 
Arkansas Department of Emergency Management (ADEM) 
California Governor's Office of Emergency Services (OES)
Connecticut Department of Emergency Management and Homeland Security (DEMHS) 
Florida Division of Emergency Management (FDEM) 
Georgia Emergency Management and Homeland Security Agency (GEMHSA) 
Illinois Emergency Management Agency (IEMA) 
Indiana Department of Homeland Security 
Kansas Division of Emergency Management (KDEM)  
Louisiana Governors Office of Homeland Security and Emergency Preparedness (GOHSEP) 
Maryland Emergency Management Agency (MEMA) 
Massachusetts Emergency Management Agency (MEMA) 
Massachusetts Office of Emergency Medical Services (OEMS) 
Maine Emergency Management Agency (MEMA) 
Minnesota Division of Homeland Security and Emergency Management (HSEM) 
Mississippi Mississippi Emergency Management Agency 
Missouri State Emergency Management Agency 
New Jersey Office of Emergency Management (OEM) 
New York State Emergency Management Office (SEMO) 
North Carolina Department of Public Safety 
Ohio Emergency Management Agency  
Oklahoma Department of Emergency Management (OEM)  
Oregon Office of Emergency Management (OEM)
Pennsylvania Emergency Management Agency (PEMA) 
Rhode Island Emergency Management Agency (RIEMA) 
Tennessee Emergency Management Agency (TEMA) 
Texas Division of Emergency Management. (TDEM) 
Texas Department of State Health Services (DSHS) 
Vermont Department of Public Safety 
Virginia Department of Emergency Management (VDEM) 
Washington Military Department Emergency Management Division
West Virginia West Virginia Division of Emergency Management (WVEM) 
Wisconsin Emergency Management (WEM)

U.S. territories and commonwealths
  Emergency Management Office (CNMI EMO) 
  Puerto Rico State Agency for Emergency and Disaster Management (AEMEAD) 
  Guam Homeland Security/Office of Civil Defense (GHS/OCD)

U.S. Federal
Federal Emergency Management Agency (FEMA) 
Emergency Management Institute
EPA Office of Emergency Management 
Office of the Assistant Secretary for Preparedness and Response Office of Emergency Management 
Office of Foreign Disaster Assistance

Canada
 Public Safety Canada
 City of Toronto government Office of Emergency Management 
 British Columbia Emergency Management BC
 Emergency Management Ontario

Caribbean
 Caribbean Disaster Emergency Management Agency (CDEMA) 
  Department of Disaster Management (DDM)
  National Office of Disaster Services (NODS)
  Disaster Management Unit
  Department of Emergency Management
  National Emergency Management Organisation (NEMO)
  Department of Disaster Management
  Office of Disaster Management (ODM)
  National Disaster Management Agency (NaDMA)
  Civil Defense Commission
  Civil Protection Directorate
  Office of Disaster Preparedness and Emergency Management (ODPEM)
  Disaster Management Coordination Agency
  National Emergency Management Agency (NEMA)
  National Emergency Management Organisation (NEMO)
  National Emergency Management Organisation (NEMO)
  National Coordination Center For Disaster Relief (NCCR)
  Office of Disaster Preparedness and Management (ODPM)
  Department of Disaster Management & Emergencies

Africa
  Kenya National Disaster Operation Centre (NDOC) 
  Somali Disaster Management Agency

Asia
  National Disaster Management Authority (NDMA) 
  National Emergency Management Agency 
  National Disaster Management Authority (NDMA) 
  National Disaster Risk Reduction and Management Council (NDRRMC)

Europe
  General Directorate of Civil Emergencies (DEMA) 
  Danish Emergency Management Agency (DEMA) 
  Office of Emergency Planning (OEP) 
  Ministry of Emergency Situations (EMERCOM) 
  Civil Contingencies Secretariat (CCS)

Oceania
  Emergency Management Australia (EMA) 
  Indonesian National Board for Disaster Management (BNPB) 
  National Emergency Management Agency (NEMA)

Previous OEM Organizations
The Office for Emergency Management was a World War II office in the Executive Office of the United States government.
The U.S. Department of Health and Human Services' Public Health Emergency Preparedness (replaced by the Office of the Assistant Secretary for Preparedness and Response)

See also
Civil defense by country
Civil protection
Department of public safety
Emergency management
Emergency management in American universities
Federal Emergency Management Agency
Hazard prevention
List of state departments of homeland security
United States Environmental Protection Agency

References

Further reading

External links
 FEMA Official Site
 EPA Official Site

Emergency management by country
Emergency organizations
Emergency management